The Moving Finger is a 1942 book by Agatha Christie.

The Moving Finger may also refer to:

 "The Moving Finger" (Monsters episode)
 The Moving Finger (play), a 1928 work by Patrick Hastings
 "The Moving Finger" (short story), a 1990 story by Stephen King
 An 1895 short story collection by Mary Gaunt
 A 1919 novel by Rose Champion de Crespigny
 A story by Edith Wharton from the 1901 collection Crucial Instances
 A 1985 film based on book by Agatha Christie and directed by Roy Boulting
 Confessions of the Mind, a 1970 album by The Hollies, released in the U.S. as Moving Finger

See also
 The Moving Finger Writes, a 2010 concerto by Peter Fribbins
 "The Slowly Moving Finger", a 1964 essay by Isaac Asimov published in Of Time and Space and Other Things